This is a list of defunct airlines of Kenya.

See also

 List of airlines of Kenya
 List of airports in Kenya

References

Kenya
Airlines
Airlines, defunct